National Highway 112 (NH 112) is a highway in the Indian state of West Bengal. It runs from Barasat to Petrapole border with Bangladesh.

NH 112 was earlier denoted as NH 35.

It is one of the most important connecting links between Kolkata and Bangladesh. It is a part of the historic Jessore Road which runs from Shyambazar in North Kolkata to Jessore in Bangladesh.

NH 112 originates from National Highway 12  at Barasat Dak bangalow More and ends at Petrapole near Bangaon, traversing the district of North 24 Pargana. Its eastward continuation, N706 extends to Jessore District in Bangladesh.

Places off NH 112 
 Barasat
 Duttapukur
 Bamangachi
 Guma
 Ashoknagar
 Habra
 Gaighata
 Thakurnagar ( East Side from Jessore Road)
 Sonatikiri
 Chandpara
 Bangaon
 Petrapole

Junctions

  Terminal near Barasat
 
  Terminal at Petrapole on India-Bangladesh border

Asian Highway Network
The highway is also the part of projected highway network of Asian Highway 1 which starts from Tokyo, Japan and end in Istanbul, Turkey.

See also
 List of National Highways in India (by Highway Number)
 List of National Highways in India
 National Highways Development Project

References

External links
 NH 112 on OpenStreetMap

AH1
National highways in India
106